The 2018 Alabama State Hornets football team represented Alabama State University as a member of the East Division of the Southwestern Athletic Conference (SWAC) during 2018 NCAA Division I FCS football season. Led by first-year head coach Donald Hill-Eley, the Hornets compiled an overall record of 4–7 with a mark of 3–4 in conference play, placing fourth in the SWAC East Division. Alabama State played home games at New ASU Stadium in Montgomery, Alabama.

Previous season
The Hornets finished the 2017 season 5–6, 4–3 in SWAC play to finish in second place in the East Division.

Preseason

SWAC football media day
During the SWAC football media day held in Birmingham, Alabama on July 13, 2018, the Hornets were predicted to finish second in the East Division.

Media poll

Presason All-SWAC Team
The Hornets had six players selected to Preseason All-SWAC Teams.

Offense
2nd team

Darryl Pearson Jr. – So. QB

Tytus Howard – Sr. OL

Defense
2nd team

Christian Clark – Jr. DL

Darron Johnson – Jr. LB

Jeffrey Hill – Sr. DB

Special teams
2nd team

George Golden – So. KR

Schedule

Game summaries

Tuskegee

at Auburn

at Kennesaw State

at Grambling State

at Alcorn State

at South Alabama

vs Alabama A&M

Texas Southern

Jackson State

at Prairie View A&M

Mississippi Valley State

Players drafted into the NFL

References

Alabama State
Alabama State Hornets football seasons
Alabama State Hornets football